"Just Stand Up!" is a song performed by an all-star female charity supergroup of pop, R&B, rock, and country artists during the telethon "Stand Up to Cancer". The group was purposely billed as Artists Stand Up to Cancer to the public. The song reached number 7 in Italy, number 10 in Canada, and number 11 in the US and Ireland.

Background
American songwriter and producer Antonio "L.A." Reid conceived of the collaboration after a meeting with the founder of Stand Up to Cancer, which benefited from the proceeds of the record. Reid co-produced the track with American singer Kenneth "Babyface" Edmonds, and the single was released on August 21, 2008.

The singers performed the song live on the "Stand Up to Cancer" special, which aired simultaneously on US TV networks ABC, CBS and NBC on September 5, 2008.

The single was re-released on September 30, 2008, with the original recording, as well as the audio of the live performance. The CD was enhanced so it had special features for a computer. A music video was not produced for the single.

Performers (in order of appearance)
Beyoncé
Carrie Underwood
Rihanna
Miley Cyrus
Sheryl Crow (only on studio version) or Nicole Scherzinger (only on live version)
Fergie
Leona Lewis
Keyshia Cole
Natasha Bedingfield
LeAnn Rimes (only on studio version) 
Melissa Etheridge (only on studio version)
Mary J. Blige
Ciara
Mariah Carey
Ashanti

Chart performance
The song debuted on the Billboard Hot 100 at 78 on the week of September 13, 2008. The next week it was the greatest sales gainer and jumped 67 places to land at number 11. The next week, however, the song fell to number 36. It also peaked on the Billboard Pop 100 chart at 18. As of October 2013, "Just Stand Up!" had sold 393,000 digital downloads in the US. On the UK Singles Chart, it debuted at number 39, before climbing the chart to number 26. On the Canadian Hot 100 chart it made a "Hot Shot Debut" at number 10 in the week of September 11, 2008, based on downloads.

Live performance
The live performance was held on the "Stand Up 2 Cancer" event on September 5, 2008, aired by multiple channels. All the original artists appeared for the performance, except LeAnn Rimes, Sheryl Crow and Melissa Etheridge, with the addition of Nicole Scherzinger from The Pussycat Dolls singing the parts of Sheryl Crow. The live performance is slightly different from the original song available for download. The live performance video is available for purchase on iTunes.

Track listing
CD single
 "Just Stand Up!" – 3:37
 "Just Stand Up!" (Live Video) – 4:28

Credits and personnel

Vocalists

With vocals – Mariah Carey, Carrie Underwood, Beyoncé, Mary J. Blige, Rihanna, Fergie, Sheryl Crow, Melissa Etheridge, Natasha Bedingfield, Miley Cyrus, Leona Lewis, Keyshia Cole, LeAnn Rimes, Ciara, Ashanti and Nicole Scherzinger (only on live version)
Mariah Carey and Melissa Etheridge appears courtesy of Island Records.
Beyoncé appears courtesy of Columbia.
Mary J. Blige appears courtesy of Geffen.
Rihanna appears courtesy of Def Jam Recordings.
Fergie and Sheryl Crow appears courtesy of A&M Records.
Natasha Bedingfield appears courtesy of Epic Records.
Miley Cyrus appears courtesy of Hollywood Records.
Leona Lewis appears courtesy of Sony BMG/Syco/J.
Carrie Underwood appears courtesy of Arista Nashville.
Keyshia Cole appears courtesy of Interscope-Geffen-A&M.
LeAnn Rimes appears courtesy of Asylum-Curb.
Ashanti appears courtesy of Universal Records
Ciara appears courtesy of Zomba, Sony BMG.
Nicole Scherzinger appears courtesy of Polydor, A&M and Interscope (only on live version)

Production

Credits adapted from Discogs.

 Kenneth "Babyface" Edmonds: writer, producer, keyboards, acoustic guitar, bass, drum programming
 Ronnie "Preach" Walton: writer, co-producer, keyboards, drum programming
 Antonio "LA" Reid: executive producer, producer
 Kenya Ivey: additional background vocals
 Paul Boutin: recording and mixing
 Alejandro Venguer, Brian Garten, Marcos Tovar: additional recording
 Karen Kwak: project coordinator

Charts

Certification

References

External links
 

2008 singles
Mariah Carey songs
Beyoncé songs
Mary J. Blige songs
Rihanna songs
Fergie (singer) songs
Sheryl Crow songs
Melissa Etheridge songs
Natasha Bedingfield songs
Miley Cyrus songs
Leona Lewis songs
Carrie Underwood songs
Keyshia Cole songs
LeAnn Rimes songs
Ashanti (singer) songs
Ciara songs
Nicole Scherzinger songs
Songs written by Babyface (musician)
Song recordings produced by Babyface (musician)
2008 songs
Songs about cancer